Can You Dig It may refer to:
"Can You Dig It" (song), a 1990 single by The Mock Turtles from the album Turtle Soup
"Can You Dig It?", a song by The Beatles, a fragment of which was released as "Dig It" on the album Let It Be
"Can You Dig It?", a song on the 1968 Monkees album Head
"Can You Dig It", a song on the 1991 MC Lyte album Act Like You Know
"Can U Dig It?", a 1989 single by Pop Will Eat Itself

See also
Dig It (disambiguation)